Water pollution is an environmental issue on the West Coast of New Zealand. Water resources and water pollution come under the jurisdiction of the Resource Management Act and is controlled by the regional councils - for the West Coast it is the West Coast Regional Council.

A 2008 State of the Environment report showed that:
acid mine drainage has significant effects on freshwater ecosystems
less than 5% of the water samples taken from contact recreation sites indicated unsafe swimming conditions.  17 sites are monitored along a length of 600 km of coastline that drains hundreds of rivers. For the upper 150 km, north of Westport, there is no monitoring 
point source pollution has decreased and nonpoint source pollution has increased
Water deterioration occurs at the lower levels of a number of catchments
Water quality improvements were evident in a number of water quality indicators.

Issues

Grey River
Raw sewage is discharged into the Grey River after heavy rainfall. Historically, sewage and stormwater from Greymouth, Cobden and Blaketown was discharged directly to the Grey River. Changes to the Grey District Council's wastewater schemes provide separation and treatment for sewage, except during periods of high rainfall, such as spring, when the capacity of the sewage treatment is exceeded.

Acid mine drainage
The West Coast has a long history of mining and some of the waterways suffer from acid mine drainage as a result of the leaching of acidic water from mining activity.

Drinking water
Eighty two percent of the population is supplied by reticulated drinking water with 28% having some form of treatment to improve water quality. None of the water supplies reach drinking water standards.

Lake Brunner
The water on Lake Brunner has been monitored since the 1990s and its quality has remained relatively high, although there are concerns about the effects of significant pasture drainage from local dairy farms.

Ngakawau River
North of Westport
Water from the Stockton open cast coal mine pollutes the Ngakawau River.

Mokihinui River 

50 km north of Westport.
This river has a 68,000ha catchment, which is largely pristine and within the conservation estate upstream of the coastal region.  There are two small settlements in the low reaches and two large farms, one at the river mouth, the other in Seddonville, behind the coastal range.  The Seddonville farm is a large industrial dairy farm that in 2004 was still discharging all dairy effluent into the river. It took a concerted effort on the part of local environmentalists to get the regional council to insist on the farm installing effluent ponds.  These ponds then largely discharged into the river via a drain for many years, and were washed out during floods until a particular complaint in 2016 got the regional council to insist on an upgrade, and a shift to above the floodline.    In September 2017 milk was discovered being discharged into the river via that same drain.  Erroneous reporting in the local paper protected the farmer; it is not clear whether the erroneous reporting was the police, the regional council or reporter.  Evidence points to the dairy company refusing the milk due to unacceptable penicillin levels.  There does not appear to be any contingencies provided on the West Coast for milk rejected by Westland Milk Products.  It is unsafe to venture down McIndoes Rd, where the milking sheds and effluent ponds are, due to farmer aggression.   There has also been extensive land use change over the last decade on this farm, where 60ha or more of forest remnants/ wetlands have been destroyed for humped and hollowed pasture.  Agrichemicals and fertilizers are indiscriminately discharged onto pasture, creating non-point discharge into the river, where algal build-up during low flow often creates thick, opaque mats, although these have decreased from their worst around 2010.  The river at the popular swimming hole in Seddonville is perhaps cleaner in summer 2019 than it has been in many years, but there is still plenty of room for improvement.    
The farm at the river mouth discharges out of overflowing effluent ponds via a short stretch of creek into the lagoon.  30 years ago the stones of the lagoon sparkled in the sun, now they are coated year round in slime, and indigenous estuarine plants around the outlet are depauperate.   The regional council is not interested in insisting the farmer clean up his effluent system or adhere to consent conditions for discharge of dairy effluent; if conditions were adhered to the lagoon would be clean once again.    The farm also has its fencelines right on the edge of the sea, there is no buffer for coastal vegetation or penguin habitat.  There are very few trees in paddocks and few riparian shade margins along streams on either farm.

See also
Water pollution in New Zealand
Environment of New Zealand
Clean Up Our Waterways

References

External links
West Coast Regional Council

Environment of the West Coast, New Zealand
Water pollution in New Zealand